SHA-2 (Secure Hash Algorithm 2) is a set of cryptographic hash functions designed by the United States National Security Agency (NSA) and first published in 2001. They are built using the Merkle–Damgård construction, from a one-way compression function itself built using the Davies–Meyer structure from a specialized block cipher.

SHA-2 includes significant changes from its predecessor, SHA-1. The SHA-2 family consists of six hash functions with digests (hash values) that are 224, 256, 384 or 512 bits: SHA-224, SHA-256, SHA-384, SHA-512, SHA-512/224, SHA-512/256. SHA-256 and SHA-512 are novel hash functions computed with eight 32-bit and 64-bit words, respectively. They use different shift amounts and additive constants, but their structures are otherwise virtually identical, differing only in the number of rounds. SHA-224 and SHA-384 are truncated versions of SHA-256 and SHA-512 respectively, computed with different initial values. SHA-512/224 and SHA-512/256 are also truncated versions of SHA-512, but the initial values are generated using the method described in Federal Information Processing Standards (FIPS) PUB 180-4.

SHA-2 was first published by the National Institute of Standards and Technology (NIST) as a U.S. federal standard. The SHA-2 family of algorithms are patented in the U.S.. The United States has released the patent under a royalty-free license.

As of 2011, the best public attacks break preimage resistance for 52 out of 64 rounds of SHA-256 or 57 out of 80 rounds of SHA-512, and collision resistance for 46 out of 64 rounds of SHA-256.

Hash standard

With the publication of FIPS PUB 180-2, NIST added three additional hash functions in the SHA family. The algorithms are collectively known as SHA-2, named after their digest lengths (in bits): SHA-256, SHA-384, and SHA-512.

The algorithms were first published in 2001 in the draft FIPS PUB 180-2, at which time public review and comments were accepted. In August 2002, FIPS PUB 180-2 became the new Secure Hash Standard, replacing FIPS PUB 180-1, which was released in April 1995. The updated standard included the original SHA-1 algorithm, with updated technical notation consistent with that describing the inner workings of the SHA-2 family.

In February 2004, a change notice was published for FIPS PUB 180-2, specifying an additional variant, SHA-224, defined to match the key length of two-key Triple DES. In October 2008, the standard was updated in FIPS PUB 180-3, including SHA-224 from the change notice, but otherwise making no fundamental changes to the standard. The primary motivation for updating the standard was relocating security information about the hash algorithms and recommendations for their use to Special Publications 800-107 and 800-57. Detailed test data and example message digests were also removed from the standard, and provided as separate documents.

In January 2011, NIST published SP800-131A, which specified a move from the then-current minimum of 80-bit security (provided by SHA-1) allowable for federal government use until the end of 2013, to 112-bit security (provided by SHA-2) being both the minimum requirement (starting in 2014) and the recommended security level (starting from the publication date in 2011).

In March 2012, the standard was updated in FIPS PUB 180-4, adding the hash functions SHA-512/224 and SHA-512/256, and describing a method for generating initial values for truncated versions of SHA-512. Additionally, a restriction on padding the input data prior to hash calculation was removed, allowing hash data to be calculated simultaneously with content generation, such as a real-time video or audio feed. Padding the final data block must still occur prior to hash output.

In July 2012, NIST revised SP800-57, which provides guidance for cryptographic key management. The publication disallowed creation of digital signatures with a hash security lower than 112 bits after 2013. The previous revision from 2007 specified the cutoff to be the end of 2010. In August 2012, NIST revised SP800-107 in the same manner.

The NIST hash function competition selected a new hash function, SHA-3, in 2012. The SHA-3 algorithm is not derived from SHA-2.

Applications

The SHA-2 hash function is implemented in some widely used security applications and protocols, including TLS and SSL, PGP, SSH, S/MIME, and IPsec.

SHA-256 is used for authenticating Debian software packages and in the DKIM message signing standard; SHA-512 is part of a system to authenticate archival video from the International Criminal Tribunal of the Rwandan genocide. SHA-256 and SHA-512 are proposed for use in DNSSEC. Unix and Linux vendors are moving to using 256- and 512-bit SHA-2 for secure password hashing.

Several cryptocurrencies, including Bitcoin, use SHA-256 for verifying transactions and calculating proof of work or proof of stake. The rise of ASIC SHA-2 accelerator chips has led to the use of scrypt-based proof-of-work schemes.

SHA-1 and SHA-2 are the Secure Hash Algorithms required by law for use in certain U.S. Government applications, including use within other cryptographic algorithms and protocols, for the protection of sensitive unclassified information. FIPS PUB 180-1 also encouraged adoption and use of SHA-1 by private and commercial organizations. SHA-1 is being retired for most government uses; the U.S. National Institute of Standards and Technology says, "Federal agencies should stop using SHA-1 for...applications that require collision resistance as soon as practical, and must use the SHA-2 family of hash functions for these applications after 2010" (emphasis in original). NIST's directive that U.S. government agencies must stop uses of SHA-1 after 2010 was hoped to accelerate migration away from SHA-1.

The SHA-2 functions were not quickly adopted initially, despite better security than SHA-1. Reasons might include lack of support for SHA-2 on systems running Windows XP SP2 or older and a lack of perceived urgency since SHA-1 collisions had not yet been found. The Google Chrome team announced a plan to make their web browser gradually stop honoring SHA-1-dependent TLS certificates over a period from late 2014 and early 2015. Similarly, Microsoft announced that Internet Explorer and Edge would stop honoring public SHA-1-signed TLS certificates from February 2017. Mozilla disabled SHA-1 in early January 2016, but had to re-enable it temporarily via a Firefox update, after problems with web-based user interfaces of some router models and security appliances.

Cryptanalysis and validation
For a hash function for which L is the number of bits in the message digest, finding a message that corresponds to a given message digest can always be done using a brute force search in 2L evaluations. This is called a preimage attack and may or may not be practical depending on L and the particular computing environment. The second criterion, finding two different messages that produce the same message digest, known as a collision, requires on average only 2L/2 evaluations using a birthday attack.

Some of the applications that use cryptographic hashes, such as password storage, are only minimally affected by a collision attack. Constructing a password that works for a given account requires a preimage attack, as well as access to the hash of the original password (typically in the shadow file) which may or may not be trivial. Reversing password encryption (e.g., to obtain a password to try against a user's account elsewhere) is not made possible by the attacks. (However, even a secure password hash cannot prevent brute-force attacks on weak passwords.)

In the case of document signing, an attacker could not simply fake a signature from an existing document—the attacker would have to produce a pair of documents, one innocuous and one damaging, and get the private key holder to sign the innocuous document. There are practical circumstances in which this is possible; until the end of 2008, it was possible to create forged SSL certificates using an MD5 collision which would be accepted by widely used web browsers.

Increased interest in cryptographic hash analysis during the SHA-3 competition produced several new attacks on the SHA-2 family, the best of which are given in the table below. Only the collision attacks are of practical complexity; none of the attacks extend to the full round hash function.

At FSE 2012, researchers at Sony gave a presentation suggesting pseudo-collision attacks could be extended to 52 rounds on SHA-256 and 57 rounds on SHA-512 by building upon the biclique pseudo-preimage attack.

Official validation

Implementations of all FIPS-approved security functions can be officially validated through the CMVP program, jointly run by the National Institute of Standards and Technology (NIST) and the Communications Security Establishment (CSE). For informal verification, a package to generate a high number of test vectors is made available for download on the NIST site; the resulting verification, however, does not replace the formal CMVP validation, which is required by law for certain applications.

, there are over 1300 validated implementations of SHA-256 and over 900 of SHA-512, with only 5 of them being capable of handling messages with a length in bits not a multiple of eight while supporting both variants.

Test vectors
Hash values of an empty string (i.e., a zero-length input text).
 
 0x d14a028c2a3a2bc9476102bb288234c415a2b01f828ea62ac5b3e42f
 
 0x e3b0c44298fc1c149afbf4c8996fb92427ae41e4649b934ca495991b7852b855
 
 0x 38b060a751ac96384cd9327eb1b1e36a21fdb71114be07434c0cc7bf63f6e1da274edebfe76f65fbd51ad2f14898b95b
 
 0x cf83e1357eefb8bdf1542850d66d8007d620e4050b5715dc83f4a921d36ce9ce47d0d13c5d85f2b0ff8318d2877eec2f63b931bd47417a81a538327af927da3e
 
 0x 6ed0dd02806fa89e25de060c19d3ac86cabb87d6a0ddd05c333b84f4
 
 0x c672b8d1ef56ed28ab87c3622c5114069bdd3ad7b8f9737498d0c01ecef0967a

Even a small change in the message will (with overwhelming probability) result in a different hash, due to the avalanche effect. For example, adding a period to the end of the following sentence changes almost half (111 out of 224) of the bits in the hash, equivalent to picking a new hash at random:
 
 0x 730e109bd7a8a32b1cb9d9a09aa2325d2430587ddbc0c38bad911525
 
 0x 619cba8e8e05826e9b8c519c0a5c68f4fb653e8a3d8aa04bb2c8cd4c

Pseudocode
Pseudocode for the SHA-256 algorithm follows. Note the great increase in mixing between bits of the w[16..63] words compared to SHA-1.

 
 
 {{color|green|Note 3: The compression function uses 8 working variables, a through h}}
 
     
     
 
 
 
 h0 := 0x6a09e667
 h1 := 0xbb67ae85
 h2 := 0x3c6ef372
 h3 := 0xa54ff53a
 h4 := 0x510e527f
 h5 := 0x9b05688c
 h6 := 0x1f83d9ab
 h7 := 0x5be0cd19
 
 
 
 k[0..63] :=
    0x428a2f98, 0x71374491, 0xb5c0fbcf, 0xe9b5dba5, 0x3956c25b, 0x59f111f1, 0x923f82a4, 0xab1c5ed5,
    0xd807aa98, 0x12835b01, 0x243185be, 0x550c7dc3, 0x72be5d74, 0x80deb1fe, 0x9bdc06a7, 0xc19bf174,
    0xe49b69c1, 0xefbe4786, 0x0fc19dc6, 0x240ca1cc, 0x2de92c6f, 0x4a7484aa, 0x5cb0a9dc, 0x76f988da,
    0x983e5152, 0xa831c66d, 0xb00327c8, 0xbf597fc7, 0xc6e00bf3, 0xd5a79147, 0x06ca6351, 0x14292967,
    0x27b70a85, 0x2e1b2138, 0x4d2c6dfc, 0x53380d13, 0x650a7354, 0x766a0abb, 0x81c2c92e, 0x92722c85,
    0xa2bfe8a1, 0xa81a664b, 0xc24b8b70, 0xc76c51a3, 0xd192e819, 0xd6990624, 0xf40e3585, 0x106aa070,
    0x19a4c116, 0x1e376c08, 0x2748774c, 0x34b0bcb5, 0x391c0cb3, 0x4ed8aa4a, 0x5b9cca4f, 0x682e6ff3,
    0x748f82ee, 0x78a5636f, 0x84c87814, 0x8cc70208, 0x90befffa, 0xa4506ceb, 0xbef9a3f7, 0xc67178f2
 
 
 begin with the original message of length L bits
 append a single '1' bit
 append K '0' bits, where K is the minimum number >= 0 such that (L + 1 + K + 64) is a multiple of 512
 append L as a 64-bit big-endian integer, making the total post-processed length a multiple of 512 bits
 such that the bits in the message are: <original message of length L> 1 <K zeros> <L as 64 bit integer> , (the number of bits will be a multiple of 512)
 
 
 break message into 512-bit chunks
 for each chunk
     create a 64-entry message schedule array w[0..63] of 32-bit words
     
     copy chunk into first 16 words w[0..15] of the message schedule array
 
     
     for i from 16 to 63
         s0 := (w[i-15] rightrotate  7) xor (w[i-15] rightrotate 18) xor (w[i-15] rightshift  3)
         s1 := (w[i-2] rightrotate 17) xor (w[i-2] rightrotate 19) xor (w[i-2] rightshift 10)
         w[i] := w[i-16] + s0 + w[i-7] + s1
 
     
     a := h0
     b := h1
     c := h2
     d := h3
     e := h4
     f := h5
     g := h6
     h := h7
 
     
     for i from 0 to 63
         S1 := (e rightrotate 6) xor (e rightrotate 11) xor (e rightrotate 25)
         ch := (e and f) xor ((not e) and g)
         temp1 := h + S1 + ch + k[i] + w[i]
         S0 := (a rightrotate 2) xor (a rightrotate 13) xor (a rightrotate 22)
         maj := (a and b) xor (a and c) xor (b and c)
         temp2 := S0 + maj
  
         h := g
         g := f
         f := e
         e := d + temp1
         d := c
         c := b
         b := a
          := temp1 + temp2
 
     
     h0 := h0 + a
     h1 := h1 + b
     h2 := h2 + c
     h3 := h3 + d
     h4 := h4 + e
     h5 := h5 + f
     h6 := h6 + g
     h7 := h7 + h
 
 
 digest := hash := h0 append h1 append h2 append h3 append h4 append h5 append h6 append h7

The computation of the ch and maj values can be optimized the same way as described for SHA-1.

SHA-224 is identical to SHA-256, except that:
 the initial hash values h0 through h7 are different, and
 the output is constructed by omitting h7.
 
 
 h[0..7] :=
     0xc1059ed8, 0x367cd507, 0x3070dd17, 0xf70e5939, 0xffc00b31, 0x68581511, 0x64f98fa7, 0xbefa4fa4

SHA-512 is identical in structure to SHA-256, but:
 the message is broken into 1024-bit chunks,
 the initial hash values and round constants are extended to 64 bits,
 there are 80 rounds instead of 64,
 the message schedule array w has 80 64-bit words instead of 64 32-bit words,
 to extend the message schedule array w, the loop is from 16 to 79 instead of from 16 to 63,
 the round constants are based on the first 80 primes 2..409,
 the word size used for calculations is 64 bits long,
 the appended length of the message (before pre-processing), in bits, is a 128-bit big-endian integer, and
 the shift and rotate amounts used are different.

 
 
 h[0..7] := 0x6a09e667f3bcc908, 0xbb67ae8584caa73b, 0x3c6ef372fe94f82b, 0xa54ff53a5f1d36f1, 
            0x510e527fade682d1, 0x9b05688c2b3e6c1f, 0x1f83d9abfb41bd6b, 0x5be0cd19137e2179
 
 
 
 k[0..79] := 0x428a2f98d728ae22, 0x7137449123ef65cd, 0xb5c0fbcfec4d3b2f, 0xe9b5dba58189dbbc, 0x3956c25bf348b538, 
             0x59f111f1b605d019, 0x923f82a4af194f9b, 0xab1c5ed5da6d8118, 0xd807aa98a3030242, 0x12835b0145706fbe, 
             0x243185be4ee4b28c, 0x550c7dc3d5ffb4e2, 0x72be5d74f27b896f, 0x80deb1fe3b1696b1, 0x9bdc06a725c71235, 
             0xc19bf174cf692694, 0xe49b69c19ef14ad2, 0xefbe4786384f25e3, 0x0fc19dc68b8cd5b5, 0x240ca1cc77ac9c65, 
             0x2de92c6f592b0275, 0x4a7484aa6ea6e483, 0x5cb0a9dcbd41fbd4, 0x76f988da831153b5, 0x983e5152ee66dfab, 
             0xa831c66d2db43210, 0xb00327c898fb213f, 0xbf597fc7beef0ee4, 0xc6e00bf33da88fc2, 0xd5a79147930aa725, 
             0x06ca6351e003826f, 0x142929670a0e6e70, 0x27b70a8546d22ffc, 0x2e1b21385c26c926, 0x4d2c6dfc5ac42aed, 
             0x53380d139d95b3df, 0x650a73548baf63de, 0x766a0abb3c77b2a8, 0x81c2c92e47edaee6, 0x92722c851482353b, 
             0xa2bfe8a14cf10364, 0xa81a664bbc423001, 0xc24b8b70d0f89791, 0xc76c51a30654be30, 0xd192e819d6ef5218, 
             0xd69906245565a910, 0xf40e35855771202a, 0x106aa07032bbd1b8, 0x19a4c116b8d2d0c8, 0x1e376c085141ab53, 
             0x2748774cdf8eeb99, 0x34b0bcb5e19b48a8, 0x391c0cb3c5c95a63, 0x4ed8aa4ae3418acb, 0x5b9cca4f7763e373, 
             0x682e6ff3d6b2b8a3, 0x748f82ee5defb2fc, 0x78a5636f43172f60, 0x84c87814a1f0ab72, 0x8cc702081a6439ec, 
             0x90befffa23631e28, 0xa4506cebde82bde9, 0xbef9a3f7b2c67915, 0xc67178f2e372532b, 0xca273eceea26619c, 
             0xd186b8c721c0c207, 0xeada7dd6cde0eb1e, 0xf57d4f7fee6ed178, 0x06f067aa72176fba, 0x0a637dc5a2c898a6, 
             0x113f9804bef90dae, 0x1b710b35131c471b, 0x28db77f523047d84, 0x32caab7b40c72493, 0x3c9ebe0a15c9bebc, 
             0x431d67c49c100d4c, 0x4cc5d4becb3e42b6, 0x597f299cfc657e2a, 0x5fcb6fab3ad6faec, 0x6c44198c4a475817
 
 
 
 S0 := (a rightrotate 28) xor (a rightrotate 34) xor (a rightrotate 39)
 S1 := (e rightrotate 14) xor (e rightrotate 18) xor (e rightrotate 41)
 
 s0 := (w[i-15] rightrotate 1) xor (w[i-15] rightrotate 8) xor (w[i-15] rightshift 7)
 s1 := (w[i-2] rightrotate 19) xor (w[i-2] rightrotate 61) xor (w[i-2] rightshift 6)

SHA-384 is identical to SHA-512, except that:
 the initial hash values h0 through h7 are different (taken from the 9th through 16th primes), and
 the output is constructed by omitting h6 and h7.
 
 
 h[0..7] := 0xcbbb9d5dc1059ed8, 0x629a292a367cd507, 0x9159015a3070dd17, 0x152fecd8f70e5939, 
            0x67332667ffc00b31, 0x8eb44a8768581511, 0xdb0c2e0d64f98fa7, 0x47b5481dbefa4fa4

SHA-512/t is identical to SHA-512 except that:
 the initial hash values h0 through h7 are given by the SHA-512/t IV generation function,
 the output is constructed by truncating the concatenation of h0 through h7 at t bits,
 t equal to 384 is not allowed, instead SHA-384 should be used as specified, and
 t values 224 and 256 are especially mentioned as approved.

The SHA-512/t IV generation function evaluates a modified SHA-512 on the ASCII string "SHA-512/t", substituted with the decimal representation of t.  The modified SHA-512 is the same as SHA-512 except its initial values h0 through h7 have each been XORed with the hexadecimal constant 0xa5a5a5a5a5a5a5a5.

Sample C implementation for SHA-2 family of hash functions can be found in RFC 6234.

Comparison of SHA functions
In the table below, internal state'' means the "internal hash sum" after each compression of a data block.

In the bitwise operations column, "Rot" stands for rotate no carry, and "Shr" stands for right logical shift. All of these algorithms employ modular addition in some fashion except for SHA-3.

More detailed performance measurements on modern processor architectures are given in the table below.

The performance numbers labeled 'x86' were running using 32-bit code on 64-bit processors, whereas the 'x86-64' numbers are native 64-bit code. While SHA-256 is designed for 32-bit calculations, it does benefit from code optimized for 64-bit processors on the x86 architecture. 32-bit implementations of SHA-512 are significantly slower than their 64-bit counterparts. Variants of both algorithms with different output sizes will perform similarly, since the message expansion and compression functions are identical, and only the initial hash values and output sizes are different. The best implementations of MD5 and SHA-1 perform between 4.5 and 6 cycles per byte on modern processors.

Testing was performed by the University of Illinois at Chicago on their hydra8 system running an Intel Xeon E3-1275 V2 at a clock speed of 3.5 GHz, and on their hydra9 system running an AMD A10-5800K APU at a clock speed of 3.8 GHz. The referenced cycles per byte speeds above are the median performance of an algorithm digesting a 4,096 byte message using the SUPERCOP cryptographic benchmarking software. The MiB/s performance is extrapolated from the CPU clockspeed on a single core; real-world performance will vary due to a variety of factors.

Implementations 
Below is a list of cryptography libraries that support SHA-2:

 Botan
 Bouncy Castle
 Cryptlib
 Crypto++
 Libgcrypt
 Mbed TLS
 libsodium
 Nettle
 LibreSSL
 OpenSSL
 GnuTLS
 wolfSSL

Hardware acceleration is provided by the following processor extensions:

 Intel SHA extensions: Available on some Intel and AMD x86 processors.
 VIA PadLock
 ARMv8 Cryptography Extensions 
 IBM z/Architecture:  Available since 2005 as part of the Message-Security-Assist Extensions 1 (SHA-256) and 2 (SHA-512)
 IBM Power ISA since Since v 2.07

See also

 Comparison of cryptographic hash functions
 Comparison of cryptography libraries
 Hash function security summary
 Hashcash
 HMAC
 International Association for Cryptologic Research (IACR)
 sha1sum (sha224sum, sha256sum, sha384sum and sha512sum) commands
 Trusted timestamping

References

Further reading

 Henri Gilbert, Helena Handschuh: Security Analysis of SHA-256 and Sisters. Selected Areas in Cryptography 2003: pp175–193

External links

 Descriptions of SHA-256, SHA-384, and SHA-512 from NIST
 SHA-2 Checker – SHAChecker to check one's SSL compatibility for SHA-2
 SHA-256 Calculator – SHA-256 Calculator
 SHA-256 Hash Generator – SHA256 Generator - Also serves other critical secure hash algorithms
 Specifications for a Secure Hash Standard (SHS) – Draft for proposed SHS (SHA-0)
 Secure Hash Standard (SHS) – Proposed SHS (SHA-0)
 CSRC Cryptographic Toolkit – Official NIST site for the Secure Hash Standard
 FIPS PUB 180-4: Secure Hash Standard (SHS) (PDF, 834 KB) – Current version of the Secure Hash Standard (SHA-1, SHA-224, SHA-256, SHA-384, and SHA-512), August 2015
 Test vectors for SHA-256/384/512 from the NESSIE project
 Test vectors for SHA-1, SHA-2 from NIST site
 NIST Cryptographic Hash Project – SHA-3 competition
 : "A 224-bit One-way Hash Function: SHA-224"
 : "US Secure Hash Algorithms (SHA and SHA-based HMAC and HKDF)"; contains sample C implementation
 SHA-256 algorithm demonstration

Cryptographic hash functions
Articles with example pseudocode
Checksum algorithms
National Security Agency cryptography